The Kentucky Thoroughblades were a minor professional ice hockey team in the American Hockey League, who existed from 1996 to 2001. The Thoroughblades were based in Lexington, Kentucky, playing home games at Rupp Arena. The Thoroughblades were an affiliate of the NHL's San Jose Sharks.

History
The Thoroughblades were the first professional ice hockey team to play in Lexington, Kentucky. Initially, attendance was high. During the 1997–98 season, Kentucky averaged 7,847 fans per game, despite a losing record on ice. Attendance decreased in the next three seasons, even with two consecutive division championships. In their final season, attendance averaged only 4,461 fans per game.

In 2001, the team moved to Cleveland, Ohio, becoming the Cleveland Barons. In 2006, the team then moved to Worcester, Massachusetts, becoming the Worcester Sharks.  In 2015, the team moved to San Jose, California to become the San Jose Barracuda.

The void in Lexington was replaced in 2001, by another minor league hockey team, the Lexington Men O' War of the ECHL, lasting one season in Lexington.

Season-by-season results

Regular season

Playoffs

Notables
 Miikka Kiprusoff
 Johan Hedberg
 Evgeni Nabokov
 Vesa Toskala
 Jonathan Cheechoo
 Dan Boyle
 Zdeno Chara
 Andy Lundbohm
 Matt Bradley
 Garrett Burnett

Career leaders
 Goals: 88 (Steve Guolla, 1996–99)
 Assists: 132 (Steve Guolla, 1996–99)
 Points: 220 (Steve Guolla, 1996–99)
 PIM: 692 (Garrett Burnett, 1998–00)

References

External links
 Stats from hockeydb.com

 
Ice hockey clubs established in 1996
Ice hockey clubs disestablished in 2001
Ice hockey teams in Kentucky
Defunct ice hockey teams in the United States
1996 establishments in Kentucky
2001 disestablishments in Kentucky
San Jose Sharks minor league affiliates
New York Islanders minor league affiliates
Florida Panthers minor league affiliates